Paul Hinman (born 1959) is a Canadian politician and businessman. He is the former leader of the Wildrose Independence Party of Alberta since 2020 and was formerly the leader of the Wildrose Alliance (2008–2009) and Alberta Alliance Party (2005–2008).  He served two terms as a member of the Legislative Assembly of Alberta, initially from 2004 to 2008 representing the electoral district of Cardston-Taber-Warner and then from 2009 to 2012 in Calgary-Glenmore.

Early life
Hinman was born in Edmonton in 1959. He grew up in Calgary in the neighbourhood of Haysboro. As of 2022, Hinman lives in the town of Raymond, Alberta.

Hinman's grandfather Edgar "Ted" Hinman was a Member of the Legislative Assembly for Cardston and as Provincial Treasurer in the Social Credit government under Ernest Manning.

Before politics, Hinman was an irrigation farmer, cow-calf producer, purebred-cattle breeder, feedlot operator and small-business entrepreneur. He attended the University of Alberta Faculty of Pharmacy.

Hinman is a libertarian, telling Calgary Herald columnist Don Braid in 2009 "I'm all about sharing ideas and inspiring others, not requiring others to do things. It's just so necessary for peace and prosperity to flourish. If people impose their will on others, it's just wrong."

He is a member of the Church of Jesus Christ of Latter-day Saints. He spent two years in the Philippines serving as a Mormon Missionary and learned to speak Tagalog. He described a divorce he went through as a painful and difficult trial in his faith that he overcame. He remains an active Mormon and still holds to its values.

Political career
Hinman worked for the Reform Party of Canada in policy and election committees. He later worked for the Conservative Party of Canada. He served as a board member for the federal Conservative Party of Canada in the electoral district of Lethbridge.

In provincial politics, he was the southern regional director for the Alberta First Party. Hinman served as vice-president of policy for the Alberta Alliance Party from its founding convention on February 14, 2002, until he was named deputy leader on January 8, 2005.

Alberta Alliance Party

MLA of Cardston-Taber-Warner 
As a candidate for the Alberta Alliance Party, Hinman was elected to his first term as the Member of the Legislative Assembly (MLA) representing the constituency of Cardston-Taber-Warner in the 2004 provincial election on November 22, 2004.

He defeated incumbent Broyce Jacobs the Progressive Conservatives candidate by 129 votes. Hinman was the only Alberta Alliance Party candidate elected in 2004. He was defeated in the 2008 provincial election by 39 votes after three recounts.

Leadership election 
After the 2004 provincial election, former Alberta Alliance leader Randy Thorsteinson stepped down as leader of the party.

Hinman was one of four candidates who ran in the 2005 Alberta Alliance Party leadership election. The other three candidates were Ed Klop, Marilyn Burns and David Crutcher.

Hinman won the election on the third ballot at the leadership convention held on November 19, 2005, in Red Deer, Alberta.

Endorsement of Jason Kenney's UCP leadership campaign
On September 8, 2017, Danielle Smith of NewsTalk770 and Hinman's successor as Wildrose leader announced that Hinman would be running for the leadership of the newly formed United Conservative Party. However, Hinman ultimately declined to run and posted to his Twitter that he was endorsing Jason Kenney.

In December 2021, he told Fort McMurray Today that he was no longer a supporter of Kenney or the UCP, and that "Jason Kenney and the UCP have betrayed us by not standing up to Ottawa."

Wildrose Alliance
Under Hinman's leadership, the Alberta Alliance and the Wildrose Party of Alberta merged to unite the right wing of the political spectrum in Alberta at a convention held on January 19, 2008, in Calgary.

In the 2008 provincial election, Hinman lost to his Progressive Conservative opponent, Broyce Jacobs by 39 votes. The party gained more popular vote in the riding.  The party also gained popular vote in most of the other ridings where it ran candidates, but did not secure any seats.

Hinman received accolades during the campaign for his performance in the televised leaders debate.

A year later, Hinman stepped down as leader of the Wildrose Alliance Party, triggering a leadership convention in October 2009 in Edmonton. Hinman remained interim leader of the Alliance until the election of Danielle Smith as party leader on October 17.

Calgary-Glenmore by-election 
On May 15, 2009 Calgary-Glenmore MLA Ron Stevens announced his resignation to accept a position as a judge. Hinman ran in the ensuing by-election Hinman was selected as the Wildrose Alliance candidate at a nomination meeting and won the by-election with 37% of the vote.

Wildrose Independence Party

Hinamn was made interim leader of the Wildrose Independence Party of Alberta in July 2020 and elected leader in 2021. The party campaigns on Alberta separatism. It has no connection with the former Wildrose Party that merged with the Progressive Conservative Association of Alberta to create the United Conservative Party.

Following Jason Kenney's announcement on May 17, 2022 that he would be resigning as premier of Alberta, Hinman was rumoured to be interested in running for leadership of the UCP. Hinman said he had no interest in leading the party and said the UCP's divisions that led to Kenney's resignation would help the Wildrose Independence Party with recruitment.

Fort McMurray-Lac La Biche by-election 
Hinman ran in the 2022 Fort McMurray-Lac La Biche by-election. Hinman was not a resident of the Fort McMurray or Lac La Biche regions, but denied he was an opportunist or ignorant of local issues facing the riding.

He told Fort McMurray Today he was running as a candidate because he felt it was “the most important election in Alberta’s near-term history." He said he had stopped supporting Kenney and the UCP because he felt "Jason Kenney and the UCP have betrayed us by not standing up to Ottawa." 

Hinman finished third in the by-election, finishing behind NDP candidate Ariana Mancini and UCP MLA Brian Jean.

Leadership struggles and disputes with the board 
After the Fort McMurray-Lac La Biche by-election, the party began a review of Hinman's leadership and his performance in the by-election. After the review concluded, he was removed as party leader on June 28, 2022.

The review accused Hinman of paying himself with party money during the by-election. The review also wrote that Hinman was not familiar with the needs and concerns shared by people living in the riding, despite his commentary on community issues at local forums and in interviews with Harvard Media's CFVR-FM and Fort McMurray Today. The review was not released publicly, but a copy was leaked to the Western Standard.

Hinman denied all of the party's accusations against him. He told CTV News that the party was being taken over by "implants, plants, agents inside our board" who are opposed to an independent Alberta. Hinman was reinstated as leader during the party's annual general meeting in Red Deer on July 23, 2022. The party's board of governors were forced out.

A Court of King's Bench justice ruled on October 21 that Hinman had been legally removed as leader of the party and that the interim party leader was Jeevan Mangat. Hinman is appealing the decision. The party's board also accused Hinman and his supporters of disrupting the AGM and pressuring people to either leave or support Hinman. They are suing Hinman for $180,000.

Hinman told the Medicine Hat News he is focusing on his legal battles with the party's leadership and would not be running in the Brooks-Medicine Hat by-election.

Electoral record

References

External links
 Legislative Assembly of Alberta Members Listing
 Wildrose Alliance Party website

1959 births
20th-century Mormon missionaries
Alberta Alliance Party MLAs
Canadian Latter Day Saints
Canadian libertarians
Canadian Mormon missionaries
Living people
Mormon missionaries in the Philippines
Politicians from Edmonton
University of Alberta alumni
Wildrose Party MLAs
21st-century Canadian politicians
Western Canadian separatists
Maverick Party politicians